The following is a timeline of fleet aircraft carriers of the Royal Navy of the United Kingdom.
The first British aircraft carrier was HMS Argus, a converted liner hull. 

In addition, during the Second World War, the Royal Navy operated flights of aircraft off Merchant aircraft carriers.

Timeline

In general, labels for ships of a single class are aligned vertically with the topmost ship in a column carrying the class name.

In an attempt to show the full timeline of the actual existence of each ship, the final dates on each bar may variously be the date struck, sold, scrapped, scuttled, sunk as a reef, etc., as appropriate to show the last time it existed as a floating object.

See also 

 Aircraft carrier
 List of aircraft carriers
 List of aircraft carriers by configuration
 List of aircraft carriers in service
 List of aircraft carriers of the United States Navy
 List of aircraft maintenance carriers of the Royal Navy
 List of aircraft carriers of Russia and the Soviet Union
 List of amphibious warfare ships
 List of escort aircraft carriers of the Royal Navy
 List of German aircraft carriers
 List of seaplane carriers of the Royal Navy
 List of sunken aircraft carriers
 Timeline for aircraft carrier service

References 

Aircraft carriers
Royal Navy